Robert William Shaddock (November 15, 1920 – April 22, 1991) was an American professional basketball player. He appeared in two games for the Syracuse Nationals in the National Basketball League during the 1946–47 season. Shaddock spent the remainder of his career playing for various teams in the New York State Professional Basketball League.

References

1920 births
1991 deaths
Amateur Athletic Union men's basketball players
United States Army personnel of World War II
American men's basketball players
Basketball players from New York (state)
Guards (basketball)
People from Corning, New York
Syracuse Orange men's basketball players
Syracuse Nationals players